Thomas Bowler may refer to:

 Thomas William Bowler (1812–1869), British landscape painter
 Thomas Bowler (RAF officer) (1895–1974), Royal Air Force officer